William Harrison "Jack" Dempsey (June 24, 1895 – May 31, 1983), nicknamed Kid Blackie and The Manassa Mauler, was an American professional boxer who competed from 1914 to 1927, and reigned as the world heavyweight champion from 1919 to 1926. A cultural icon of the 1920s, Dempsey's aggressive fighting style and exceptional punching power made him one of the most popular boxers in history. Many of his fights set financial and attendance records, including the first million-dollar gate. He pioneered the live broadcast of sporting events in general, and boxing matches in particular.

Dempsey is ranked tenth on The Ring magazine's list of all-time heavyweights and seventh among its Top 100 Greatest Punchers, while in 1950 the Associated Press voted him as the greatest fighter of the past 50 years. He is a member of the International Boxing Hall of Fame, and was in the previous Boxing Hall of Fame.

Early life and career

Early life and family background
Born William Harrison Dempsey in Manassa, Colorado in 1895, he grew up in Colorado and West Virginia. The son of Mary Celia (née Smoot) and Hiram Dempsey, he was of part Irish ancestry and also claimed to be partially Cherokee.

William A. Dempsey, of Logan County, West Virginia, identified his son John Dempsey, Jr. of Mud Fork of Island Creek as executor of his last will and testament dated May 1, 1875. Upon payment of his debts and funeral expenses, he directed that his wife Mahulda receive the balance of his personal property while his six children receive an equal share of his real estate. His last will and testament, as witnessed by Estella, John, and Hiram Dempsey, was presented to the Logan County clerk on August 10, 1875.

Hiram and Celia Dempsey, parents to Jack, left West Virginia in 1887. One newspaper referred to them as "active workers" for the Church of Jesus Christ of Latter-day Saints.

Dempsey was baptized into the Church of Jesus Christ of Latter-day Saints,  in 1903 following his eighth birthday, the "age of accountability", according to church doctrine.

Hiram Dempsey and his family returned to Logan County when Jack was a small boy where he was raised until shortly before commencement of his boxing career. Said the Logan Banner: "While he was a mere child they returned to Logan county. Jack remained here until a young man, having been employed by the Gay Coal and Coke Company as late as 1913, and then went west alone to seek pugilistic fortune. He met Jack Kearns on the Pacific coast, from which point his spectacular climb to the pinnacle of the heavyweight division furnished the sport with one of its most romantic episodes." In January 1924, the Banner reported on Dempsey's trip from New York to Florida, stating that he "used to call Logan home." In August 1926, the Banner reported how local boxer Bear Cat Clemons sparred two rounds per day with Dempsey at Saratoga Lake, New York, remarking: "When Dempsey and Clemons face each other in the squared circle, it is Logan county versus Logan county."

The Banner, in a small September 1926 item, provided more history about Dempsey's Logan County roots: "The Dempsey family at one time lived on Mud Fork and another period near the Logan-Mingo line. Many relatives live in the two counties; and they as well as his former friends have taken pride in his prowess and successes. As a boy Jack and O.D. Avis, sports editor of The Banner, used to set up pins in a bowling alley on the Main street corner now occupied by the Logan garage." In June 1927, former Logan County sheriff Don Chafin traveled to New York to watch the Dempsey-Sharkey fight. The Logan Banner reported: "Mr. Chafin has attended every fight in which Dempsey has participated since he won the world's championship in Toledo. They have been close friends since Dempsey was a boy and a familiar figure about Logan."

Celia Dempsey, mother to Jack and at that time a resident of Utah, visited Huntington and Logan in September 1927. Said the Logan Banner: "Interviewed at Huntington Mrs. Dempsey told of her desire to revisit girlhood scenes and inquired about old friends. She spoke of Uncle Dyke Garrett and was pleasantly surprised to learn that he is still living. Uncle Dyke read the interview and despite the nearness of his 86th birthday, came back up from his home back of Chapmanville to welcome Mrs. Dempsey. This beloved old mountain minister never knew Jack Dempsey, but he remembers Jack’s mother as a girl, her maiden name being Cecilia Smoot. She was a daughter of Charles Smoot, who came to Logan from Boone County, and who lived and died up on Island Creek. After his death, Mrs. Smoot (Jack Dempsey’s grandmother) married Simpson Ellis, who died but a few years ago, after serving a long period on the county court. Scott Justice, who divides his time between Huntington and Logan, was among those who greeted Mrs. Dempsey at the Huntington Hotel yesterday. He remembers the marriage of Hiram Dempsey and Cecilia Smoot, and also recalls that the site on which the town of Holden now stands was sold by Hiram Dempsey to Mr. Justice’s father when the family decided to migrate westward. According to Mr. Justice, the tract of 200 acres changed hands for a consideration of $600. 'Uncle' Enoch Baker was another caller to greet the challenger’s mother. Mr. Baker was engaged in business in Logan county when the Dempseys lived here, being well acquainted with the family. While in Logan, Mrs. Dempsey will visit her half-brothers, Don Ellis of Stratton Street, and Joseph and John B. Ellis of Island Creek, and others."

Mrs. Dempsey spent six days in Logan, quartering at the Aracoma Hotel. Her departure yielded an additional story: "By the time they reached Sharples Mrs. Dempsey missed a hatbox containing a $3500 watch, a gift from her famous son, and two valuable rings. They returned at once to Logan and after an anxious search found the missing box with contents undisturbed alongside the Washington apartments. Evidently it had fallen into the street and some passerby had placed it against the building, presumably without knowledge or curiosity as to the nature of its contents. While Mrs. Dempsey seemed to have enjoyed her visit in West Virginia and expressed a hope that she could come back next year for a longer stay, she said she wouldn’t want to live back here again because of the difference in climate. However, the people are more sociable here, she added, and are much more friendly upon first acquaintance."

Kid Blackie

Because his father had difficulty finding work, the family traveled often and Dempsey dropped out of elementary school to work and left home at the age of 16. Due to his lack of money, he frequently rode the rods and slept in hobo camps. Desperate for money, Dempsey would occasionally visit saloons and challenge for fights, saying "I can't sing and I can't dance, but I can lick any SOB in the house." If anyone accepted the challenge, bets would be made. According to Dempsey's autobiography, he rarely lost these barroom brawls. For a short time, Dempsey was a part-time bodyguard for Thomas F. Kearns, president of The Salt Lake Tribune and son of Utah's U.S. Senator Thomas Kearns.

Dempsey often fought under the pseudonym, "Kid Blackie", although during his stint in the Salt Lake City area, he went by "Young Dempsey". Much of his early career is not recorded, and stated thus, in The Ring Record Book as compiled by Nat Fleischer.

Jack Dempsey
He first competed as "Jack Dempsey" (by his own recollection) in the fall of 1914, in Cripple Creek, Colorado. His brother, Bernie, who often fought under the pseudonym "Jack Dempsey"—this a common practice of the day, in fighters' admiration of middleweight boxer and former champion, Jack "Nonpareil" Dempsey—had signed to fight veteran George Copelin. Upon learning Copelin had sparred with then current world heavyweight champion Jack Johnson, and given Bernie Dempsey was nearing 40 years of age, he strategically decided to back out of the fight. He substituted his brother, still unknown in Eastern Colorado, as "Jack Dempsey". The fans at ringside immediately knew this was not the man they had paid to see.

The promoter became violently angry and "sailed into us, barehanded", threatening to stop the fight. Copelin himself, who outweighed Dempsey by 20 lbs. (165 to 145) upon seeing Dempsey's small stature in the ring, warned the promoter, "I might kill that skinny guy." The promoter reluctantly permitted the fight to commence, and in his first outing as "Jack Dempsey", the future champion downed Copelin six times in the first round and twice in the second. From there, it was a battle of attrition ("Neither Bernie nor I had taken into consideration the high altitude at Cripple Creek."), until a last knockdown of Copelin in the seventh, moved the referee to make the then-unusual move of stopping the fight once Copelin regained his feet. According to Dempsey "In those days they didn't stop mining-town fights as long as one guy could move." This trial by fire carried with it a $100 purse. The promoter, angered at the switch pulled by the brothers, had laid no promised side bets, "... and even if I did, I wouldn't give you anything."

Such lessons were hard, but fighting was something Jack Dempsey did well. Following the name change, Dempsey won six bouts in a row by knockout before losing on a disqualification in four rounds to Jack Downey. During this early part of his career, Dempsey campaigned in Utah, frequently entering fights in towns in the Wasatch Mountain Range region.  He followed his loss against Downey with a knockout win and two draws versus Johnny Sudenberg in Nevada. Three more wins and a draw followed when he met Downey again, this time resulting in a four-round draw.  Following these wins, Dempsey racked up 10 more wins that included matches against Sudenberg and Downey, knocking out Downey in two rounds.  These wins were followed with three no-decision matches, although at this point in the history of boxing, the use of judges to score a fight was often forbidden, so if a fight went the distance, it was called a draw or a no decision, depending on the state or county where the fight was held.

After the United States entered World War I in 1917, Dempsey worked in a shipyard and continued to box. Afterward, he was accused by some boxing fans of being a slacker for not enlisting. This remained a black mark on his reputation until 1920, when evidence produced showed he had registered with the U.S. Army, but been exempted due to hardship (having a dependent wife). After the war, Dempsey spent two years in Salt Lake City, "bumming around" as he called it, before returning to the ring.

World heavyweight champion

Among his opponents as a rising contender were Fireman Jim Flynn, the only boxer ever to beat Dempsey by a knockout when Dempsey lost to him in the first round (although some boxing historians believe the fight was a "fix"), and Gunboat Smith, formerly a highly ranked contender who had beaten both World Champion Jess Willard and Hall of Famer Sam Langford. Dempsey beat Smith for the third time on a second-round knockout.

Before he employed the long-experienced Jack Kearns as his manager, Dempsey was first managed by John J. Reisler.

One year later, in 1918, Dempsey fought in 17 matches, going 15–1 with one no-decision. One of those fights was with Flynn, who was knocked out by Dempsey, coincidentally, in the first round. Among other matches won that year were against Light Heavyweight Champion Battling Levinsky, Bill Brennan, Fred Fulton, Carl E. Morris, Billy Miske, heavyweight Lefty Jim McGettigan, and Homer Smith. In 1919, he won five consecutive regular bouts by knockout in the first round as well as a one-round special bout.

Title fight and controversy
On July 4, 1919, Dempsey and world heavyweight champion Jess Willard met at Toledo for the world title. Pro lightweight fighter Benny Leonard predicted a victory for the 6'1", 187-pound Dempsey even though Willard, known as the "Pottawatamie Giant", was 6'" tall and 245 pounds. Ultimately, Willard was knocked down seven times by Dempsey in the first round.

Accounts of the fight reported that Willard suffered a broken jaw, broken ribs, several broken teeth, and a number of deep fractures to his facial bones. This aroused suspicion that Dempsey had cheated, with some questioning how the force capable of causing such damage had been transmitted through Dempsey's knuckles without fracturing them.

Other reports, however, failed to mention Willard suffered any real injuries. The New York Times account of the fight described severe swelling visible on one side of Willard's face, but did not mention any broken bones. A still photograph of Willard following the fight appears to show discoloration and swelling on his face.

Following the match, Willard was quoted as saying, "Dempsey is a remarkable hitter. It was the first time that I had ever been knocked off my feet. I have sent many birds home in the same bruised condition that I am in, and now I know how they felt. I sincerely wish Dempsey all the luck possible and hope that he garnishes all the riches that comes with the championship. I have had my fling with the title. I was champion for four years and I assure you that they'll never have to give a benefit for me. I have invested the money I have made".  Willard later said he had been defeated by "gangsterism".

After being fired by Dempsey, manager Jack Kearns gave an account of the fight in the January 20, 1964, issue of Sports Illustrated that has become known as the "loaded gloves theory". In the interview, Kearns said he had informed Dempsey he had wagered his share of the purse favoring a Dempsey win with a first-round knockout.  Kearns further stated he had applied plaster of Paris to the wrappings on the fighter's hands.

Boxing historian J. J. Johnston said, "the films show Willard upon entering the ring walking over to Dempsey and examining his hands." That, along with an experiment conducted by a boxing magazine designed to re-enact the fight have been noted as proof that Kearns' story was false.

The Ring founder and editor Nat Fleischer said he had been present when Dempsey's hands were wrapped, stating, "Jack Dempsey had no loaded gloves, and no plaster of Paris over his bandages. I watched the proceedings and the only person who had anything to do with the taping of Jack's hands was Deforest. Kearns had nothing to do with it, so his plaster of Paris story is simply not true."

Deforest himself said that he regarded the stories of Dempsey's gloves being loaded as libel, calling them "trash", and said he did not apply any foreign substance to them, "which I can verify since I watched the taping." Sports writer Red Smith, in Dempsey's obituary published by The New York Times was openly dismissive of the claim.

Another rumor is that Dempsey used a knuckleduster during the first round.  Some speculated that the object used was a rail spike. In the Los Angeles Times on July 3, 1979, Joe Stone, an ex-referee and boxing writer, asserted that in a film taken of the fight an object on the canvas could be seen after the final knockdown. He further asserted that the object appears to be removed by someone from Dempsey's corner. In the same film, however, Dempsey can be seen at various times during the fight pushing and holding with Willard with the palm of the glove in question and holding on to the ropes with both hands, making it next to impossible that he had any foreign object embedded in his glove, and the 'object' resembles a cigar.

Further controversy was fueled by the fact that Dempsey left the ring at the end of the first round, thinking the fight was over. This was seen as a violation of the rules, however Willard's corner did not ask for enforcement in order for the referee to disqualify Dempsey.

Title defenses

Following his victory, Dempsey traveled around the country, making publicity appearances with circuses, staging exhibitions, and appearing in a low-budget Hollywood movie. Dempsey did not defend his title until September 1920, with a fight against Billy Miske in Benton Harbor, Michigan. Miske was knocked out in three rounds.

Dempsey's second title defense was in December 1920 against Bill Brennan at Madison Square Garden, New York City. After 10 rounds, Brennan was ahead on points, and Dempsey's left ear was bleeding profusely. Dempsey rebounded to stop Brennan in the 12th round.

Jack Dempsey vs. Georges Carpentier

Dempsey's next defending fight was against French WW I hero Georges Carpentier, a fighter popular on both sides of the Atlantic. The bout was promoted by Tex Rickard and George Bernard Shaw, who claimed that Carpentier was "the greatest boxer in the world".

The Dempsey–Carpentier contest took place on July 2, 1921, at Boyle's Thirty Acres in Jersey City, New Jersey. It generated the first million-dollar gate in boxing history; a crowd of 91,000 watched the fight. Though it was deemed "the Fight of the Century", experts anticipated a one-sided win for Dempsey.  Radio pioneer RCA arranged for live coverage of the match via KDKA, making the event the first national radio broadcast.

Carpentier wobbled Dempsey with a hard right in the second round. A reporter at ringside, however, counted 25 punches from Dempsey in a single 31-second exchange soon after he was supposedly injured by the right. Carpentier also broke his thumb in that round, which crippled his chances. Dempsey ended up winning the match in the fourth round.

Dempsey did not defend his title again until July 1923 against Tommy Gibbons in Shelby, Montana. Dempsey won the match as result of a 15-round decision.

The last successful title defense for Dempsey was in September 1923 at New York City's Polo Grounds in Dempsey vs. Firpo. Attendance was 85,000, with another 20,000 trying to get inside the arena. Firpo was knocked down repeatedly by Dempsey, yet continued to battle back, even knocking Dempsey down twice. On the second occasion he was floored, Dempsey flew head-first through the ring ropes, landing on a ringside reporter's typewriter. At this point he was out of the ring for approximately 14 seconds, less than the 20 second rule for out-of-ring knockouts. Nevertheless, he was helped back into the ring by the writers at ringside. Ultimately, Dempsey beat Argentine contender Luis Ángel Firpo with a second-round KO. The fight was transmitted live by radio to Buenos Aires.

Dempsey's heavyweight title-defending fights, exhibition fights, movies, and endorsements, made Dempsey one of the richest athletes in the world, putting him on the cover of Time.

Time off from boxing

Dempsey did not defend his title for three years following the Firpo fight. There was pressure from the public and the media for Dempsey to defend his title against Black contender Harry Wills. Disagreement exists among boxing historians as to whether Dempsey avoided Wills, though Dempsey claimed he was willing to fight him. When he originally won the title, however, he had said he would no longer fight Black boxers.

Instead of continuing to defend his title, Dempsey earned money with boxing exhibitions, product endorsements, and by appearing in films, such as the adventure film serial Daredevil Jack. Dempsey also did a lot of traveling, spending, and partying. During this time away from competitive fighting, Dempsey married actress Estelle Taylor in 1925 and fired his long-time trainer/manager Jack "Doc" Kearns. Kearns repeatedly sued Dempsey for large sums of money following his firing.

In April 1924, Dempsey was appointed to an executive position in the Irish Worker League (IWL). The IWL was a Soviet-backed Communist group founded in Dublin by Irish labour leader Jim Larkin.

Loss of title
In September 1926, Dempsey fought the Irish American and former U.S. Marine Gene Tunney in Philadelphia, a fighter who had only lost once in his career.  In spite of his record and Dempsey's inactivity, Tunney was considered the underdog against Dempsey.

The match ended in an upset, with Dempsey losing his title on points in 10 rounds. When the defeated Dempsey returned to his dressing room, he explained his loss to his wife by saying, "Honey, I forgot to duck." Fifty-five years later president Ronald Reagan borrowed this quote when his wife Nancy visited him in the emergency room after the attempt on his life.

Post-title loss

Following his loss of the heavyweight title, Dempsey contemplated retiring but decided to try a comeback.  It was during this time period that tragedy struck his family when his brother, John Dempsey, shot his estranged wife Edna (aged 21) and then killed himself in a murder–suicide, leaving behind a two-year-old son, Bruce.  Dempsey was called upon to identify the bodies and was emotionally affected by the incident.

During a July 21, 1927 fight at Yankee Stadium, Dempsey knocked out future heavyweight champion Jack Sharkey in the seventh round.  The fight was an elimination bout for a title shot against Tunney. The fight was very competitive until the end.  The fight ended controversially when Sharkey claimed Dempsey had been hitting him below the belt. When Sharkey turned to the referee to complain, he left himself unprotected and Dempsey crashed a left hook onto his foe's chin. Sharkey was unable to beat the ten-count. At the time of the knockout, Dempsey was leading on the scorecards.

Tunney rematch: "The Long Count"

The Dempsey–Tunney rematch took place in Chicago, Illinois, on September 22, 1927  one day less than a year after losing his title to Tunney. Generating more interest than the Carpentier and Firpo bouts, the fight brought in a record-setting $2 million gate. Reportedly, gangster Al Capone offered to fix the rematch in his favor, but the referee was changed to prevent that from happening. Millions around the country listened to the match by radio while hundreds of reporters covered the event. Tunney was paid a record one million dollars for the rematch.  Today's equivalent in U.S. currency would be approximately $.00.

Dempsey was losing the fight on points when in the seventh round he knocked Tunney down with a left hook to the chin then landed several more punches. A new rule instituted at the time of the fight mandated that when a fighter knocked down an opponent, he must immediately go to a neutral corner.  Dempsey, however, refused to immediately move to the neutral corner when instructed by the referee. The referee had to escort Dempsey to the neutral corner, which bought Tunney at least an extra five seconds to recover.  Even though the official timekeeper clocked 14 seconds Tunney was down, Tunney got up at the referee's count of 9.  Dempsey then attempted to finish Tunney off before the end of the round, but failed to do so.  Tunney dropped Dempsey for a count of one in round eight and won the final two rounds of the fight, retaining the title of world heavyweight champion on a unanimous decision. Ironically, the neutral corner rule was requested during negotiations by members of the Dempsey camp. Another discrepancy was, when Tunney knocked Dempsey down, the timekeeper started the count immediately, not waiting for Tunney to move to a neutral corner. Because of the controversial nature of the fight due to the neutral corner rule and conflicting counts, the Dempsey–Tunney rematch remains known as "The Long Count Fight".

Post-retirement life

Dempsey retired from boxing following the Tunney rematch, but continued doing exhibition bouts with over one hundred matches between 1930 and 1931 alone.  Following retirement, Dempsey became known as a philanthropist.  In June 1932, he sponsored the "Ride of Champions" bucking horse event at Reno, Nevada with the "Dempsey Trophy" going to legendary bronc rider Pete Knight. In 1933, Dempsey was approached by Metro-Goldwyn-Mayer to portray a boxer in the film, The Prizefighter and the Lady, directed by W. S. Van Dyke and co-starring Myrna Loy. Dempsey portrayed himself in the role of referee of the climactic fight between Max Baer (playing the role of Steve Morgan) and Primo Carnera (playing himself), a fictional battle that foreshadowed their actual championship bout only a year later.  Dempsey attempted a boxing comeback in 1940 at the age of 45, setting a match against Cowboy Lutrell on July 1.  The fight resulted in Dempsey knocking Lutrell out in the second round.  Dempsey won two more exhibitions with early knockouts before deciding to call off the comeback and retire for good.

The Riviera del Pacifico Cultural and Convention Center in Ensenada, Baja California, Mexico,  built in 1930, was  a gambling casino supposedly financed by Al Capone and managed by Dempsey. Its clientele included George Raft, Errol Flynn, Myrna Loy, Lana Turner, Rita Hayworth, and Dolores del Río.

In 1935, Dempsey opened Jack Dempsey's Restaurant in New York City on Eighth Avenue and 50th Street, across from the third Madison Square Garden.  The restaurant's name was later changed to Jack Dempsey's Broadway Restaurant when it relocated to Times Square on Broadway between 49th and 50th Streets.  It remained open until 1974. Dempsey was also a co-owner of the Howard Manor in Palm Springs, California.

Dempsey married four times; his first two wives were Maxine Gates (married from 1916 to 1919) and Estelle Taylor (married in 1925). Dempsey divorced Taylor in 1931, and married Broadway singer and recent divorcee Hannah Williams in 1933.  Williams was previously married to bandleader Roger Wolfe Kahn.  Dempsey and Williams had two children together and divorced in 1943.  Dempsey then married Deanna Piatelli, remaining married to her until his death in 1983.  The couple had one child, a daughter, whom they adopted together, and who would later write a book on Dempsey's life with Piatelli.

Service during World War II

When the United States entered World War II, Dempsey had an opportunity to refute any remaining criticism of his war record of two decades earlier. He joined the New York State Guard and was given a commission as a first lieutenant, later resigning that commission to accept a commission as a lieutenant in the Coast Guard Reserve. He reported for duty in June 1942 at Coast Guard Training Station, Manhattan Beach, Brooklyn, New York, where he was assigned as "Director of Physical Education". As part of the ongoing war effort, he made personal appearances at fights, camps, hospitals, and war bond drives. He was promoted to lieutenant commander in December 1942 and commander in March 1944. In 1944, he was assigned to the transport . In 1945, he was on board the attack transport  for the invasion of Okinawa. He was released from active duty in September 1945 and received an honorable discharge from the Coast Guard Reserve in 1952.

Later life

Dempsey authored a book on boxing titled Championship Fighting: Explosive Punching and Aggressive Defense and published in 1950. The book emphasizes knockout power derived from enabling fast motion from one's heavy bodyweight.

After the world-famous Louis-Schmeling fight, Dempsey stated he was glad he never had to face Joe Louis in the ring; when Louis eventually fell on hard times financially, Dempsey served as honorary chairman of a relief fund to assist him.

Dempsey made friends with former opponents Wills and Tunney after retirement, with Dempsey campaigning for Tunney's son, Democrat John V. Tunney, when he successfully ran for the U.S. Senate, from California. He was also one of many boxers to attend the funeral of Feab S. Williams, who boxed under the name of George Godfrey.

One of Dempsey's best friends was Judge John Sirica, who presided over the Watergate trials.

Legacy
Dempsey was an inaugural 1954 inductee to The Ring magazine's Boxing Hall of Fame (disbanded in 1987), and was an inaugural 1990 inductee to the International Boxing Hall of Fame. In 1970, Dempsey became part of the "charter class" in the Utah Sports Hall of Fame.

He recounted an incident where he was assaulted while walking home at night, telling the press in 1971 that the two young muggers attempted to grab his arms, but he broke free and laid them both out cold on the sidewalk. The story of the encounter appeared in the Hendersonville Times-News, and reported the incident had taken place "a few years [earlier]".
In 1977, in collaboration with his daughter Barbara Lynn, Dempsey published his autobiography, titled Dempsey. In tribute to his legacy and boxing career, a 2004 PBS documentary summarized "Dempsey's boxing style consisted of constantly bobbing and weaving. His attacks were furious and sustained. Behind it all was rage. His aggressive behavior prompted a rule that boxers had to retreat to a neutral corner and give opponents who had been knocked down a chance to get up." According to the Encyclopædia Britannica, constant attack was his strategic defense.
In 2011, Dempsey was posthumously inducted into the Irish American Hall of Fame.

Dempsey was a Freemason and member of Kenwood Lodge #800 in Chicago, Illinois.

Death
On May 31, 1983, Dempsey died of heart failure at the age of 87 in New York City. His body was buried at Southampton Cemetery in Southampton, New York.

Professional boxing record

All newspaper decisions are officially regarded as "no decision" bouts and are not counted in the win/loss/draw column.

Published works

See also
List of heavyweight boxing champions

References

Footnotes

Notes

Further reading

 
 Williams, Iain Cameron. The KAHNS of Fifth Avenue: the Crazy Rhythm of Otto Hermann Kahn and the Kahn Family, 2022, iwp publishing, chapter 16 – details in-depth Dempsey's marriage to Hannah Williams, the former wife of Otto Hermann Kahn's son Roger Wolfe Kahn.

External links

https://boxrec.com/media/index.php/NYSAC_World_Heavyweight_Title_Fights
https://boxrec.com/media/index.php/NBA_World_Heavyweight_Title_Fights
Boxing Hall of Fame
ESPN.com

 Jack Dempsey's New York Restaurant

Free Downloadable Menu from Jack Dempsey's New York Restaurant

Jack Dempsey at Virtual History
Jack Dempsey profile at Cyber Boxing Zone
advertising poster to the Carpentier fight, 1921

 
1895 births
1983 deaths
American Freemasons
Latter Day Saints from Colorado
American Latter Day Saints
American people of Irish descent
American people of Cherokee descent
Boxers from Colorado
Irish male boxers
World boxing champions
Boxers from California
International Boxing Hall of Fame inductees
Native American boxers
People from Manassa, Colorado
Sportspeople from Colorado
United States Coast Guard officers
World heavyweight boxing champions
American male boxers
Light-heavyweight boxers
New York National Guard personnel
National Guard (United States) officers
United States Coast Guard personnel of World War II
United States Coast Guard reservists